SS Imperator was a German ocean liner built for the Hamburg America Line (Hamburg Amerikanische Paketfahrt Aktien Gesellschaft, or HAPAG), launched in 1912. At the time of her completion in June 1913, she was the largest passenger ship in the world by gross tonnage, surpassing the new White Star liner Olympic.

Imperator was the first of a trio of successively larger Hamburg American liners that included SS Vaterland (later the United States Liner Leviathan) and SS Bismarck (later the White Star Line Majestic) all of which were seized as war reparations.

Imperator served for 14 months on HAPAG's transatlantic route, until the outbreak of World War I, after which he remained in port in Hamburg. After the war, he was briefly commissioned into the United States Navy as USS Imperator (ID-4080) and employed as a transport, returning American troops from Europe. Following his service with the U.S. Navy, Imperator was handed over to Britain's Cunard Line as part of war reparations, due to the loss of the RMS Lusitania, where he sailed as the flagship RMS Berengaria for the last 20 years of his career. William H. Miller wrote that "despite his German heritage and the barely disguised Teutonic tone of his interiors, he was thought of in the 1920s and 30s as one of Britain's finest liners."

Construction and early career

The first plates of the keel were laid in 1910 at the Vulcan Shipyards in Hamburg, Germany and the ship made his maiden voyage in 1913. At 52,117 gross register tons, Imperator was the largest ship in the world until Vaterland sailed in May 1914. After the sinking of the Titanic in April 1912, the shipyard added more lifeboats to Imperator to ensure there was more than enough room for all passengers and crew. In total, Imperator would carry 83 lifeboats capable of holding 5,500 people between them, 300 more than the ship's maximum capacity.

Several weeks later, he was fitted with a figurehead, an imposing bronze eagle, increasing his length past that of Aquitania. The eagle was created by Professor Bruno Kruse of Berlin, and adorned his forepeak with a banner emblazoned with HAPAG's motto Mein Feld ist die Welt (My field is the world). The eagle's wings were torn off in an Atlantic storm during the 1914 season, after which the figurehead was removed and replaced with gold scroll-work similar to that on the stern.

During his initial sea trials, the ship ran aground on the Elbe river due to insufficient dredging and flash fire in the engine room which resulted in eight crewmen being taken to hospital. During his official trials, he suffered overheating of the turbines and some stability issues were discovered. The trials were therefore abandoned and the builders were called in to carry out emergency work. Coincidentally, 1913 was the silver jubilee year for the Kaiser, so he was going to be treated to an overnight cruise on the North Sea before the ship would make its maiden voyage.  The overnight cruise was canceled; it was eventually carried out in July of that year.

Imperator left on his maiden voyage on Wednesday, 11 June 1913, with Commodore Hans Ruser in command and Hamburg-Amerika appointing four other captains for the journey to make sure that everything went smoothly. On the way, he stopped at Southampton and Cherbourg before proceeding across the Atlantic to New York, arriving on 19 June 1913. On board were 4,986 people, consisting of 859 first-class passengers, 647 second-class passengers, 648 third-class passengers, 1,495 in steerage, and 1,332 crew. The ship returned to Europe from Hoboken, New Jersey, on 25 June 1913.

On his first arrival, the harbor pilot assigned to bring him into the Ambrose channel, Captain George Seeth, noted that the ship listed from side to side when the helm changed the ship's direction. He was soon nicknamed "Limperator".

In October 1913, Imperator returned to the Vulkan shipyard to facilitate drastic work to improve handling and stability, as it had been discovered that his center of gravity was too high (see metacentric height). To correct the problem, the marble bathroom suites in first class were removed and heavy furniture was replaced with lightweight wicker cane. Finally, 2,000 tons of cement was poured into the ship's double bottom as ballast. This work cost £200,000, which had to be borne by the shipyard as part of their five-year warranty to the shipowners. At the same time, an advanced fire sprinkler system was fitted throughout the ship, as several fires had occurred on board since the vessel had entered service.

During the 1914 refit of Imperator, Commodore Ruser handed over command of the ship to Captain Theo Kier and left to take command of the new larger flagship Vaterland, which was nearing completion. Imperator returned to service on 11 March, arriving in New York five days later on the 19th.

The SS Imperator was often referred to in masculine form because Kaiser Wilhelm thought that Imperator was a male name.

Interiors
The architect and designer Charles Mewès were responsible for the interior design of the Imperator and his sister ships. One German critic commented on the prevalence of French-style décor on the new ship: 

One contemporary review noted how the ship's "great size...has enabled his designers to allow unusual space for passenger accommodation." This was echoed in The Master, Mate, and Pilot, which stated that "taking advantage of his great dimensions, the ships' public cabins, and staterooms have been made so large as to avoid any suggestion of crowding." Space-saving devices like berths and folding washbasins were eliminated in the First-Class staterooms on Imperator, all of which had free-standing beds and marble-topped washstands with hot and cold running water. Almost all First-Class cabins were "outside" cabins, meaning they had portholes or windows for natural light and ventilation. Over 200 cabins were reserved for single occupancy, and 150 had en-suite bathrooms. The two "Imperial" suites had 12 rooms each, including a breakfast room, private veranda, sitting room, and servants' quarters.

The main First-Class dining room was on F Deck and there were two restaurants on B Deck. The main dining room could accommodate 700 diners at tables for between 2 and 8 people. The Ritz-Carlton restaurant, which was joined with a winter garden/palm court in the Directoire style, was managed by staff from the Carlton Hotel in London. There was also a Grill Room at the aft end of B Deck, a tea garden, and a Veranda café. Other First-Class public rooms included a 72-foot-long lounge/ballroom, several ladies sitting rooms, and a smoking room. The Tudor style smoking room was decorated with brick from a demolished Tudor-era cottage in England. The lounge, or "Social Hall", as it was called, was hung with Gobelins tapestries and included a stage for theatrical performances to be held. In the evening the carpet could be removed for dancing. Off the entrance halls were amenities like a bookshop, florist, pharmacy, doctor's office, and the offices of the purser, chief steward, and baggage master.

Imperator introduced a two-deck-high, Pompeiian-style swimming pool for its First-Class passengers. It was inspired by a similar swimming pool built in 1907 at the Royal Automobile Club in London. Connected to the pool were Turkish baths, steam baths, electric baths, massage and hairdressing rooms. The gymnasium was "the largest and most luxurious that has ever been fitted up on a passenger steamer...", according to The Marine Engineering and Naval Architect. For the first time on an ocean liner, Second-Class had its own gymnasium as well. Second-Class passengers also had their own smoking room, reading and writing rooms, dining room, and music room.

World War I and U.S. Navy service
In August 1914, as World War I began, he was laid up at Hamburg and remained inactive for more than four years, falling into dilapidation. Following the Armistice of 11 November 1918, Imperator was taken over by the Allied Food Shipping and Finance Agreement, and allocated to the United States for temporary use as a transport alongside Vaterland, which was now renamed SS Leviathan and bringing American service personnel home from France.

He was commissioned as the USS Imperator (ID-4080) in early May 1919. After embarking 2,100 American troops and 1,100 passengers, Imperator departed Brest, France on 15 May 1919, arriving at New York City one week later. Operating with the Cruiser and Transport Force from 3 June to 10 August, he made three cruises from New York to Brest, returning over 25,000 troops, nurses, and civilians to the United States.

The then president-elect of Brazil Epit%C3%A1cio Pessoa was on board Jeanne d'Arc and Imperator received him and his party for transport to the United States, arriving there several days later.

Decommissioned at Hoboken, New Jersey in early 1919, Imperator was transferred to the British Shipping Controller on 20 September, and it was decided that Cunard would operate him. Captain Charles A. Smith and a full crew were sent out to New York on  the new operators and the official handover from the American Board of shipping to Cunard took place on 24 November. Imperator was then transferred to Cunard's pier 54 for Cunard service.

Cunard service as Berengaria

The ship arrived at Southampton on Sunday 10 December 1919 and then proceeded to Liverpool for what was planned to be a quick overhaul (he was scheduled to leave on his first voyage for the new owners on 10 January 1920). Upon inspection, the ship was found to be in poor condition. During dry-docking on 6 January, it was found that the ship's rudder had a piece missing and the propellers were suffering from erosion on their leading edges. These issues were attended to while the ship was refurbished with items borrowed from the Cunard vessels Transylvania and Carmania.

Due to the extent of the work that had to be carried out, Imperator remained at Liverpool until 21 February and during this time the company's annual dinner was held on board before the ship returned to service on the North Atlantic. On 2 March 1920, the ship left New York, taking nine days to reach Southampton. During the voyage, Imperator developed a severe list that was found to be caused by a faulty ash ejector. Cunard decided that the ship was in need of a major overhaul and he was withdrawn from service.

Sir Arthur Rostron of the RMS Titanic passenger rescue fame and former captain of  took command of Imperator in July 1920. The following year both Imperator and Aquitania were sent to Armstrong Whitworth shipyards to be converted from coal firing to oil.

The ship was renamed after the English queen Berengaria of Navarre, wife of Richard the Lionheart, in February 1921. Many Cunard ships had been named for parts of the Roman Empire and had names that ended in "ia". Like several other Cunard ships, RMS Berengaria kept the "ia" ending to his name but was not named after a province of the ancient world.

In September 1925, a security alert at sea was triggered when the Cunard company offices in New York received a message stating there was a bomb aboard Berengaria; the vessel was then 1,200 miles out from New York, bound for Southampton. The ship was searched although the passengers and most crew were not informed about the reason. A fire drill was held just before the supposed time of detonation, so passengers could be placed close to their lifeboat stations without arousing suspicion. The bomb threat failed to materialize.

On 11 May 1932, Berengaria ran aground in the Solent. He was refloated an hour later.

In May 1934, Berengaria was again in the headlines when he ran aground on mud banks at Calshot on the Solent. He was pulled free by four tugs from Southampton. The vessel suffered no damage and the incident did not affect his sailing schedule.

Despite his German heritage, Berengaria served as flagship of the Cunard fleet until replaced by his sister ship,  (also German: ex-SS Bismarck), in 1934 after the merger of Cunard with White Star Line. In later years, Berengaria was used for discounted Prohibition-dodging cruises, which earned his jocular nicknames like Bargainaria and Boringaria.

Toward the end of his service life, the ship suffered several electrical fires caused by aging wiring, and Cunard-White Star opted to retire him in 1938. He was sold to Sir John Jarvis, who had also purchased Olympic, to provide work for unemployed shipbuilders in Jarrow, County Durham. Berengaria sailed for the River Tyne under the command of Captain George Gibbons to be scrapped down to the waterline. Due to the size of the vessel and the outbreak of the Second World War, the final demolition took place only in 1946.

Gallery

References

Further reading
 The Hamburg-American Company's New 50,000-Ton Liner (International Marine Engineering feature article, August 1912, pp. 301–305, with launch photos & engineering details.)
 SS Imperator / RMS Berengaria
 Atlantic Liners: A Trio of Trios, by J. Kent Layton
 Ocean Liners, by Oliver le Goff
 The Beautiful and Damned, by F. Scott Fitzgerald
 Imperator/Berengaria, by Les Streater

External links

 S.S. Imperator at Flickr via Library of Congress
 S.S. Imperator (German Passenger Liner, 1913) – Served as USS Imperator (ID # 4080) in 1919. – Later the British passenger liner Berengaria
 USS Imperator (ID # 4080), 1919–1919.

 Imperator / Berengaria Home at Atlantic Liners.
 Ship's page at ocean-liners.com
 The Ultimate Imperator
 Chris' Cunard Page
 Final sailing to Sir John Jarvis's scrapyard; Jarow

Passenger ships of the United Kingdom
Ships built in Hamburg
Ships of the Cunard Line
Ships of the Hamburg America Line
Steamships of Germany
Steamships of the United Kingdom
Steamships of the United States
Transports of the United States Navy
World War I auxiliary ships of the United States
1912 ships
Passenger ships of Germany
Imperator-class ocean liners
Maritime incidents in 1932